An automation integrator is a systems integrator—a company or individual—who makes different versions of automation hardware and software work together, generally combining several subsystems to work together as one large system. 

The title may refer to those who only integrate hardware, although these will often work with software integrators. Software created by automation integrators allows devices to communicate with each other, as well as collecting and reporting data. 

The magazine Control Engineering  publishes an annual “Automation Integrator Guide” which lists over 2,000 automation integrators. They also give an annual system integrator of the year award to three automation integration firms. 

The Control System Integrators Association (CSIA) maintains a buyers' guide of over 1200 member and nonmember systems integrators known as the Industrial Automation Exchange, or CSIA Exchange for short.

Certification 

The Control System Integrators Association (CSIA) certifies automation integrators, through an audit based on 79 critical criteria from the best practices manual. Companies must be associate members of the CSIA to be eligible for certification. Integrators can also receive certification through a program launched in 2012 by the Robotics Industries Association.

Industries 

Automation Integrators work in a wide variety of industries which use robotics and automation. Some of the most common include:

 Automotive
 Water and Wastewater
 Manufacturing
 Packaging
 Electrical equipment
 Food and beverage
 HVAC Controls
 Oil and gas
 Chemicals
 Pharmaceuticals
 Power
 Utilities

References

External links
 The International Society of Automation
 Control System Integrators Association
 CSIA Industrial Automation Exchange
 Automation Integrator Guide

&
System integration